Winthrop may refer to:

Places

United States
Winthrop, Arkansas
Winthrop, Connecticut is a village in Deep River, Connecticut
Winthrop, Indiana
Winthrop, Iowa
Winthrop, Maine
Winthrop (CDP), Maine
Winthrop, Massachusetts
Winthrop, Minnesota
Winthrop, Missouri
Winthrop, New York
Winthrop, Washington
Mount Winthrop

Elsewhere
Winthrop, Nottinghamshire, England
Winthrop, Ontario, Canada
Winthrop, Western Australia
 Winthrop (crater), the lava-flooded remnant of a lunar impact crater in the Oceanus Procellarum

People with the surname
Winthrop (surname)

People with the given name 
Winthrop W. Aldrich
Winthrop Ames
Winthrop Smillie Boggs
Winthrop G. Brown
Winthrop Chandler
Winthrop M. Crane
Winthrop More Daniels
Winthrop Kellogg Edey
Winthrop Sargent Gilman
Winthrop Graham
Winthrop Jordan
Winthrop Kellogg
Winthrop Welles Ketcham
Winthrop Palmer
Winthrop Mackworth Praed
Winthrop Rockefeller (born: Winthrop Aldrich Rockefeller)
Winthrop Paul Rockefeller
Winthrop Rutherfurd
Winthrop Sargeant
Winthrop Sargent
Winthrop Sargent (politician)
Winthrop H. Smith
Winthrop H. Smith Jr.
Winthrop E. Stone
Paul Winthrop McCobb
Geoffrey Winthrop Young

Other uses
Winthrop (comic strip), a discontinued comic strip created by Dick Cavalli
 Winthrop House, a dormitory at Harvard University
 Winthrop Laboratories, a pharmaceuticals company that became part of Sterling Drug
Winthrop University, in Rock Hill, South Carolina
NYU Winthrop Hospital, in Mineola, New York